Homeward Looking Angel is the third studio album by American country music artist Pam Tillis. The album was a #23 album on the Billboard charts. This album produced four singles for Tillis on the Hot Country Songs charts: the Top Five hits "Shake the Sugar Tree" (#3) and "Let That Pony Run" (#4), as well as the Top 20 hits "Cleopatra, Queen of Denial" (#11) and "Do You Know Where Your Man Is" (#16). The demo tape of "Shake the Sugar Tree", sung by Stephanie Bentley, was incorporated into Tillis's recording.

"We've Tried Everything Else" was also recorded by Canadian country artist Michelle Wright on her 1994 album The Reasons Why, while "Rough and Tumble Heart" was previously recorded by Highway 101 on their 1989 album Paint the Town. The album has been certified Platinum for shipments of over 1,000,000 copies in the U.S.

Critical reception

USA Today wrote that "Tillis has a strong, flexible voice and virtuosity in country, R&B and rock."

Track listing

Personnel
Compiled from liner notes.

 Eddie Bayers – drums (5, 7)
 Stephanie Bentley – backing vocals (2)
 Bruce Bouton – pedal steel guitar (1, 3, 6)
 Dennis Burnside – organ (2)
 Larry Byrom – electric guitar (4, 5, 7-10)
 Joe Chemay – bass guitar (except 2)
 Ashley Cleveland – backing vocals (8)
 Sonny Garrish – pedal steel guitar (4, 5, 7-10), lap steel guitar (4)
 Vicki Hampton – backing vocals (8)
 John Hobbs – piano (4, 7-9)
 Bill Hullett – acoustic guitar (2), electric guitar (2), mandolin (2, 5, 7)
 John Jorgenson – acoustic guitar (6), electric guitar (1, 3)
 Mary Ann Kennedy – backing vocals (7)
 Paul Leim – drums (1, 3, 4, 6, 8, 10)
 Anthony Martin – piano, synthesizer (5, 7), backing vocals (3)
 Gary Morse – steel guitar (10)
 Steve Nathan – piano (1, 3), organ (8, 10)
 Larry Paxton – bass guitar (2)
 Pam Rose – backing vocals (7)
 Blaine Sprouce – fiddle (1, 2, 3)
 Harry Stinson – backing vocals (1)
 Pam Tillis – lead vocals, backing vocals (2, 9, 10)
 Biff Watson – acoustic guitar (except 2)
 Dennis Wilson – backing vocals (6)
 Lonnie Wilson – drums (2, 9)
 Paul Worley – acoustic guitar, electric guitar (4), electric 12-string guitar (10), tic tac bass (3), backing vocals (3)

Chart performance

References

1992 albums
Arista Records albums
Pam Tillis albums
Albums produced by Paul Worley